Targa Wrest Point is a tarmac-based rally event held on the island state of Tasmania, Australia, annually. The inaugural event was 2009. The event has a short course design by Stuart Benson of approximately 200 competitive kilometres covered in two days over sixteen closed road competitive rally stages.

Rally format 

The event is held south of Hobart in the greater Huon Valley area and visits the Tahune Airwalk on the first day of competition.

 Leg 1 Lucaston to Longley - Lucaston - Lucaston
 Leg 2 Pelverata to Cygnet - Pelverata - Pelverata

List of past winners

Modern Competition

Classic Competition

Other Targa competitions
 Targa Tasmania - Australia (TAS)
 Targa New Zealand - New Zealand
 Targa Florio - Italy
 Targa West - Australia (WA)
 Targa Newfoundland - Canada
 Targa Canada West - Canada

See also
Australian Targa Championship

References

www.targatasmania.com.au/Results/Past 
http://www.targatasmania.com.au/ 
2010 Targa Wrest Point Results

External links
 Targa Tasmania website
 Targa Wrest Point website
 Eric Bana guns it to Max | Herald Sun
 Team RedBackRacing website
 CAR703 – Rallying for Oncology Research

Motorsport competitions in Australia
Rally competitions in Australia
Motorsport in Tasmania
Recurring sporting events established in 2009